Hopea obscurinerva is a tree in the family Dipterocarpaceae, native to Borneo. The specific epithet obscurinerva means "indistinct nerve", referring to the veins on the underside of the leaf.

Description
It has low, thin buttresses. The bark is smooth. No flowers have been recorded.

Distribution and habitat
Hopea obscurinerva is endemic to Borneo, where it is confined to Sarawak.

Conservation
Hopea obscurinerva has been assessed as critically endangered on the IUCN Red List. The species is known from only two locations. It is threatened by conversion of land for plantations and by logging. The species occurs outside of protected areas.

References

obscurinerva
Endemic flora of Borneo
Flora of Sarawak
Plants described in 2004